Menges  may refer to:
 Mengeš, a town in the Upper Carniola region of Slovenia
 Municipality of Mengeš, the municipality centred on the Slovenian town
 NK Mengeš, a former football club from the Slovenian town
 Saint-Menges, a commune in the Ardennes department in northern France
 USS Menges (DE-320), an Edsall-class destroyer escort built for the United States Navy during World War II

 People
 Jim Menges (born 1951), American volleyball player
 Chris Menges (born 1940), an English cinematographer and film director (son of Herbert Menges and nephew of Isolde Menges)
 Constantine Menges (1939–2004), an American scholar, author, professor, and Latin American specialist for the CIA
 Emily Menges (born 1992), American soccer player
 Franklin Menges (1858–1956), a Republican member of the U.S. House of Representatives from Pennsylvania
 Herbert Menges (1902–1972), an English composer and conductor (father of Chris Menges and brother of Isolde Menges)
 Herbert Hugo Menges (1917–1941), an American soldier
 Isolde Menges (1893–1976), an accomplished violinist who was most active in the first part of the 20th century (sister of Herbert Menges and aunt of Chris Menges)
 Joyce Menges, an actress from 1972 to 1975
 Karl Heinrich Menges (1908–1999), German linguist
 Louis Menges (1888–1969), an American amateur football (soccer) player
 Otto Menges (1917–1944), highly decorated German soldier in World War II

See also
 Menge (disambiguation)